Isaac Fripp House Ruins is a historic house ruin and archaeological site located on Saint Helena Island near Frogmore, Beaufort County, South Carolina.  The ruins are located at Bay View overlooking the junction of Chowan Creek and the Beaufort River. The two-story, tabby house dates to the early- to mid-19th century.  It is associated with Isaac Fripp, a planter of sea island cotton and other staples on St. Helena Island.

It was listed in the National Register of Historic Places in 1988.

References

Houses on the National Register of Historic Places in South Carolina
Archaeological sites on the National Register of Historic Places in South Carolina
Houses completed in 1800
Houses in Beaufort County, South Carolina
National Register of Historic Places in Beaufort County, South Carolina
Tabby buildings